Capes & Cowls: Adventures in Wyrd City (usually referred to as Capes & Cowls or merely C&C) is an expandable "book-in-a-box" superhero board game based on Capes & Cowls: The Wyrd City Chronicles by Robin Spriggs. Prior to its commercial release by Wyrd House Press in 2006, the game had been in private circulation, according to publisher Jazz Lieberman, “for well over a decade.”

Gameplay 
Capes & Cowls is a superhero skirmish game in which two to four players each recruit a team of super-powered characters from the Wyrd City dramatis personæ and send them into battle against opposing teams.  The game is played on a specialized “Battleboard” whose color- and number-coded spaces influence character abilities, modify power levels, and place strong emphasis on strategic and tactical play. Though the outcome of some actions is occasionally determined by the roll of a “Battle Die,” luck plays only a small role in the mechanics of the game.

Capes & Cowls features three primary modes of play and several variants. The three primary modes, intended exclusively for head-to-head competition, are as follows:
BasicIn the Basic Game, each player recruits a team of two or three Heroes, deploys the team to the Battleboard, and battles with his opponent’s team for a predetermined number of rounds. The player with the most Heroes left on the Battleboard at the end of the game wins. 
Standard The Standard Game allows each player to recruit a team of four or five Heroes, and introduces Scene Features such as Rooftops, Walls, and Trees, as well as Objects such as Boulders, Cars, and Mailboxes. These elements enrich the Battleboard environment and call for keener strategies and sharper tactics. As in the Basic Game, the player with the most Heroes left on the Battleboard at the end of the game wins.
Adventure The Adventure Game requires the players to select an Adventure from the Adventure Book. Each Adventure includes a full-color map for Battleboard setup, instructions for team recruitment, and special rules for playing the chosen Adventure, including team-specific goals and victory conditions. This mode of play incorporates Crew characters, special items, and plot devices that further define the Wyrd City universe and its colorful assortment of costumed denizens. The victory in an Adventure Game goes to the player whose team succeeds in fulfilling the predetermined goal of the Adventure.

Setting
Though Capes & Cowls emulates the visual aesthetics and fanciful exploits of golden-age and silver-age superhero comic books, its action takes place in a markedly dystopian alternate universe wherein the entire known world falls under the tyrannical jurisdiction  of the Wyrd City Powers That Be (WCPTB) and its street-level enforcers, the Wyrd City Freedom Patrol.

Indignant at the appropriation of their sacred name by a government so oppressive, the celestial Sisters Wyrd unleash upon the world the long-buried forces of mystery, wonder, and magic. This act of cosmic intervention, over time, brings into being a pantheon of super-powered heroes and villains (aside from their telltale biographies and certain scenarios in the game's Adventure Book, no overt distinctions are made between the two) who find themselves at constant odds with not only the Wyrd City Freedom Patrol, but often with each other as well.

Characters	 
The characters included in the Capes & Cowls master set (all of them principals and supporting cast from the Wyrd City universe) are divided into two types—Heroes and Crews. Both are represented by stand-up figures and character cards. Heroes are depicted on large, blue character cards and defined by name, portrait, stats, and three unique powers, while Crews are depicted on small, gray character cards and defined by name, portrait, stats, and one unique power. The Heroes, Crews, and character-specific powers are as follows:  

Heroes 	 
 Baron Necro (Summon the Dead, Kiss of Death, Zombify)
 Battery-Man (Voltaic Assault, Acid Splash, Recharge)
 Black Manx (Pounce, Bad Luck, Caterwaul of Doom)
 Blaze (Fireborn, Great Balls of Fire, Up in Flames)
 Blue Malkin (Diamond Claws, Heightened Senses, Nine Lives)
 Brown Recluse (Venom Punch, Web Shoot, Hide) 
 Da-Blink (Teleport, Blink-n-Bop, Poof!)
 Dagon (Mermight, Water Speed, Perilous Waters)
 Demoniac (Glide, Demonic Descent, Infernal Resilience)
 Diablo Azul (Bedevil, Mind Control, The Devil’s Own)
 Doctor Grimfate (Curse, Thwart, Tragic End)
 Elastra (Stretch-n-Smack, Entangle, Rubberama Mama)
 Fantazm (Ghostly Grasp, Spectral Passage, Fantazmal Form)
 Frostbite (Ice Surf, Freeze Ray, Glacial Shield)
 Golden Rocket (Blast Off!, Palm Thrusters, Human Missile)
 Green Gremlin (Jinx, Marplot, Backfire)
 Hellrags (Hellfork, Soulsuck, Scarecrow Smother)
 Hotshot (Crack Shot, Boom Ball, Bull’s-eye)
 Lady Lightning (Fists of Lightning, Lightning Bolt, Lickety-split)
 Manchine (Dynablast, Power Boost, Lockdown)
 Marasmos (Wither, Shrivel, Decay)
 Mole (Tunnel, Surprise Attack, Cave-in)
 Moon-Beast (Beastly Transformation, Lunatical Vigor, Bad Moon Rising)
 Mysteria (Sorcerous Assault, Enchantment, Bewitch)
 Nightshade (Nightforce, Noctiblast, Shadow Walk)
 Red Rook (Flight, Swoop Assault, Battle Shriek)
 Serapha (Divine Ascent, Heal, Sanctuary)
 Star Knight (Star Blade, Star Shield, Stellar Leadership)
 Tenebro (Dark Rend, Scotoshield, Blackout)
 Time Meister (Time Warp, Time Rift, Time’s Up)
 Titana (Outmuscle, Harsh Mistress, Hard Woman)
 Ygg (Monstrous Smash, Thunder Stomp, Regeneration)

Crews 	 
 Arachnidrones (Spider Climb)
 Darklings (Pitch Dark)
 Diabloids (Devil Driven)
 Freedom Patrols (Freedom Blaster)
 Liberty Bots (Built for Battle)
 Thugs (Pistol)
 Zombies (Zombify)

References

External links

Capes & Cowls at Tric Trac
Capes & Cowls at Fantastic Fiction

Adventure board games
Collectible miniatures games
Board games introduced in 2006